Fontaniva is a comune (municipality) in the Province of Padua in the Italian region Veneto, located about  northwest of Venice and about  northwest of Padua.

Fontaniva borders the following municipalities: Carmignano di Brenta, Cittadella, Grantorto, San Giorgio in Bosco.

Twin towns
Fontaniva is twinned with:

  Bartın, Turkey, since 2005
  Amasra, Turkey, since 2005
  Nova Pádua, Brazil, since 2010

References

External links
 Official website

Cities and towns in Veneto